Squash has been part of the African Games since 2003 in Abuja, Nigeria.

Medal table

Host cities

Previous winners

See also
 Squash Federation of Africa

References

 
All-Africa Games
Squash
All-Africa Games